Let's Eat Grandma are a British pop group formed in 2013 by musicians Rosa Walton and Jenny Hollingworth. They released their debut studio album I, Gemini in 2016 through Transgressive Records. Their second studio album, I'm All Ears, was released in 2018. Let's Eat Grandma describe their music as "experimental sludge pop".

History
Rosa Walton and Jenny Hollingworth were both raised in Norwich, a city in Norfolk. They originally met in reception class when they were four, and began making music together at 13. They originally began creating music as a playtime activity, with their first songs being titled "The Angry Chicken" and "Get That Leg Off the Banister". Their band name is taken from a grammatical joke meant to emphasise the importance of comma placement. They became members of the local Norwich music scene, before they caught the attention of the musician Kiran Leonard, who passed their work on to their future manager.

Their debut album, I, Gemini, is composed of songs that were mostly written when Rosa and Jenny were younger. These songs include singles "Deep Six Textbook", which is about playing truant, and "Eat Shiitake Mushrooms", which was inspired by some graffiti the girls saw while walking around town in Norwich. The album was released by Transgressive Records on 17 June 2016, and received positive reviews in NME, The Guardian, Pitchfork, and Q.

Their second studio album I'm All Ears was released 29 June 2018, and was preceded by the singles "Hot Pink", "Falling Into Me", "It's Not Just Me", and "Ava". I'm All Ears received widespread acclaim from music critics, and won Album of the Year at the Q Awards.

On 20 September 2021, the duo released a single, "Hall of Mirrors", accompanied by a video. In November 2021, they announced that their third album, Two Ribbons, would be released in April 2022, containing 10 songs, and released the title track and music video the same day.

Walton also produced the song "I Really Want to Stay at Your House" for the video game Cyberpunk 2077 which would go on to feature prominently in the 2022 anime series Cyberpunk: Edgerunners.

Discography

Albums

Singles

Music videos
 "Deep Six Textbook" (2016)
 "Eat Shiitake Mushrooms" (2016)
 "Sax in the City" (2016)
 "Hot Pink" (2018)
 "It's Not Just Me" (2018)
 "Hall of Mirrors" (2021)
 "Two Ribbons" (2021)
 "Happy New Year" (2022)
 "Levitation" (2022)
 "Watching You Go" (2022)

References

External links 
 Let's Eat Grandma Are the Wonderfully Weird Pop Duo We Need Right Now, Pitchfork, 22 March  2018

English pop music duos
Experimental pop musicians
All-female bands
Musical groups established in 2013
Female musical duos
Psychedelic pop music groups
English experimental musical groups
Art pop musicians
Avant-pop musicians
2013 establishments in England
Musicians from Norwich